Kaan Tayla (born February 17, 1986) is an olympic freestyle swimmer from Turkey. He graduated from VirginiaTech, USA.

Tayla represented Turkey in the 50m and 100m freestyle events at the 2004 Summer Olympics in Athens, Greece and the 2008 Summer Olympics in Beijing, China.

He is holder of the national record in the 50m freestyle event with 22.37 set on July 14, 2008 in Atlanta, Georgia, USA. He shares another national record in 4×50 m freestyle relay with 1:28.97 set at the 2009 European Short Course Swimming Championships held in Istanbul, Turkey.

References

External links
Kaan Tayla

1986 births
Living people
Turkish male freestyle swimmers
Olympic swimmers of Turkey
Swimmers at the 2004 Summer Olympics
Swimmers at the 2008 Summer Olympics
Fenerbahçe swimmers
Binghamton University alumni
Binghamton Bearcats athletes
Virginia Tech Hokies men's swimmers